Henrik Berger (born 16 May 1969) is a retired Swedish football midfielder.

References

1969 births
Living people
Swedish footballers
Degerfors IF players
Molde FK players
IK Brage players
Association football midfielders
Swedish expatriate footballers
Expatriate footballers in Norway
Swedish expatriate sportspeople in Norway
Allsvenskan players
Superettan players